To Love Somebody is an album by jazz singer-songwriter/pianist Nina Simone. It was released as quickly as possible to prolong the unexpected success of 'Nuff Said! The title is taken from the Bee Gees song "To Love Somebody"; her cover of the song became her second British hit single after "Ain't Got No-I Got Life".

Information about songs on this album 
The title track, "To Love Somebody", as well as "I Can't See Nobody" are songs by the Bee Gees.
"Suzanne", originally by Leonard Cohen; covered by many artists by the time of this album.
"Turn! Turn! Turn!", originally by Pete Seeger. Simone recorded an alternative version of the song that was (previously) unreleased.
"Revolution" (parts 1 & 2) was Simone's third subsequent single released in the UK after "Ain't Got No–I Got Life" and "To Love Somebody" both became hits. The song was released around the time of the same titled song by The Beatles and, although it has a similar hook ("Don't you know it's gonna be – all right") and structure, most of the lyrics differ. The song also uses a guitar lick similar to "Old Brown Shoe," which had been recorded by The Beatles the same year. John Lennon commented on the similarities in a 1971 interview with Rolling Stone:
I thought it was interesting that Nina Simone did a sort of answer to "Revolution." That was very good–it was sort of like "Revolution," but not quite. That I sort of enjoyed, somebody who reacted immediately to what I had said.
The song is split into two parts because Part 2 was featured on the B-side of the single. "Revolution" didn't do well in the UK charts, and only had a mild success in the United States R&B charts. Simone didn't expect this lack of success and said to Sylvia Hampton, author of the biography Break Down and Let It All Out about this:
(…) I don't get it. It's about a revolution, man: not just colour, but everything! It's about barriers being broken down, and they sure as hell need getting rid of. (…) We need a revolution to sort it all out and get back to God. You know how lost we are, man – it's sad.
"Just Like Tom Thumb's Blues", "I Shall Be Released", and "The Times They Are a-Changin'" are songs by Bob Dylan.

Track listing
"Suzanne" (Leonard Cohen) – 4:21
"Turn! Turn! Turn! (To Everything There Is a Season)" (Traditional, Pete Seeger) – 3:41
"Revolution (Part 1)" (Weldon Irvine, Simone) – 2:53
"Revolution (Part 2)" (Weldon Irvine, Simone) – 1:54
"To Love Somebody" (Barry Gibb, Robin Gibb) – 2:42
"I Shall Be Released" (Bob Dylan) – 3:55
"I Can't See Nobody" (Barry Gibb, Robin Gibb) – 3:10
"Just Like Tom Thumb's Blues" (Bob Dylan) – 4:52
"The Times They Are a-Changin'" (Bob Dylan) – 6:00

Personnel 
 Nina Simone – vocals, piano, arrangements
 Charles D. Alias – drums
 Weldon J. Irvine – organ
 Al Schackman – guitar
 Gene A. Perla – Fender bass
 Doris Willingham – vocals
 Virdia Crawford – vocals
 Jimmy Wisner – arrangements, conductor on "To Love Somebody" and "I Can't See Nobody"
Technical
Mike Moran, Ray Hall – recording engineers

References

1969 albums
Nina Simone albums
Albums arranged by Nina Simone
Albums produced by Danny Davis (country musician)
RCA Victor albums